The Sime Darby LPGA Malaysia was a women's professional golf tournament on the LPGA Tour. It was played for the first time in October 2010 at the East Course at Kuala Lumpur Golf & Country Club in Kuala Lumpur, Malaysia.

The title sponsor was Sime Darby, Malaysia's leading multinational conglomerate involved in five core sectors: plantations, property, industrial, motors, and energy and utilities, with a growing presence in healthcare.

The debut tournament was a limited field event with 50 players invited from the official LPGA money list and an additional ten invited sponsor exemptions, including two ASEAN nations local qualifiers. A 54-hole event with no cut, all 60 players played for the entire tournament. The purse was $1.8 million.

The event was increased to 72 holes in 2011, with a no-cut field of 72 players. The purse was increased to $1.9 million.

Course layout

Winners

Tournament records

References

External links 

Coverage on the LPGA Tour's official site

Former LPGA Tour events
Golf tournaments in Malaysia
Recurring sporting events established in 2010
Recurring sporting events disestablished in 2017
2010 establishments in Malaysia
2017 disestablishments in Malaysia
Defunct sports competitions in Malaysia